Mangrol is one of the 182 Legislative Assembly constituencies of Gujarat state in India. It is part of Surat district and is reserved for candidates belonging to the Scheduled Tribes.

List of segments 
This assembly seat represents the following segments :

 Mangrol Taluka
 Umarpada Taluka

Member of Legislative Assembly

Election results

2022

2017

2012

2007

2002

See also 
 List of constituencies of Gujarat Legislative Assembly
 Gujarat Legislative Assembly

References

External links
 

Assembly constituencies of Gujarat
Surat district